Jesús María Rodríguez Hernández (born 7 July 1955) is a Mexican politician from the Institutional Revolutionary Party. From 2009 to 2012 he served as Deputy of the LXI Legislature of the Mexican Congress representing Querétaro.

See also
 List of presidents of Querétaro Municipality

References

1955 births
Living people
People from Querétaro City
Institutional Revolutionary Party politicians
Politicians from Querétaro
21st-century Mexican politicians
Municipal presidents of Querétaro
Members of the Congress of Querétaro
20th-century Mexican judges
20th-century Mexican politicians
Deputies of the LXI Legislature of Mexico
Members of the Chamber of Deputies (Mexico) for Querétaro